James Alexander Knox (born 4 November 1995) is a British road racing cyclist, who currently rides for UCI WorldTeam .

Career
In 2017, Knox came second in the under-23 version of Liège–Bastogne–Liège. In September of that year  announced that Knox would turn professional with the team for the 2018 season.

In May 2019, he was named in the startlist for the 2019 Giro d'Italia. In August 2019, he was named in the startlist for the 2019 Vuelta a España. He was in the general classification Top 10 with two stages to go, however he lost 11 minutes on the penultimate stage after crashing the day before, eventually finishing in 11th place.

Major results

2012
 8th Overall Junior Tour of Wales
1st Stage 4
2013
 3rd Overall Junior Tour of Wales
1st  Mountains classification
1st Stages 1 & 4
2014
 9th Piccolo Giro dell'Emilia
2015
 8th Trofeo PIVA
 9th Clássica Loulé
2016
 4th Overall Ronde de l'Isard
 6th Overall Course de la Paix U23
2017
 2nd Liège–Bastogne–Liège U23
 5th Overall Ronde de l'Isard
 6th Overall Tour Alsace
 8th Overall Tour of Croatia
 8th Overall Tour de l'Avenir
 8th Overall Giro della Valle d'Aosta
2018
 1st Stage 1 (TTT) Adriatica Ionica Race
 6th Overall Tour de Wallonie
2019
 3rd Overall Adriatica Ionica Race
 8th Overall UAE Tour
 10th Overall Tour de Pologne
2020
 1st Stage 1b (TTT) Settimana Internazionale di Coppi e Bartali
 7th Overall Tirreno–Adriatico
2021
 7th Trofeo Laigueglia
2022
 6th Overall Deutschland Tour

General classification results timeline

References

External links

1995 births
Living people
British male cyclists
Sportspeople from Cumbria
21st-century British people